A debugging data format is a means of storing information about a compiled computer program for use by high-level debuggers. Modern debugging data formats store enough information to allow source-level debugging.

High-level debuggers need information about variables, types, constants, subroutines and so on, so they can translate between machine-level storage and source language constructs. Such information can also be used by other software tools. The information must be generated by the compiler and stored in the executable file or dynamic library by the linker.

Some object file formats include debugging information, but others can use generic debugging data formats such as stabs and DWARF.

List of debugging formats 
 stabs
 COFF
 Portable Executable (PE/COFF)
 Relocatable Object Module Format (OMF)
 IEEE-695
 DWARF

See also 
 Debug symbol

References 

  (NB. Concentrates on DWARF, but also discusses debugging formats in general, with an overview of all the major formats.)

Computer file formats